Lesbian, gay, bisexual, and transgender (LGBT) persons in Mauritania face legal challenges not experienced by non-LGBT residents. Both male and female same-sex sexual activity is illegal in Mauritania. Muslim men who have sex with men face stoning to death, though there have been no known cases of executions caused by homosexuality charges in the country; whereas women who have sex with women face prison.

Law regarding same-sex sexual activity

Law in Mauritania is based on Sharia. According to the Article 308 of the 1983 Criminal Code, "Any adult Muslim man who commits an impudent or unnatural act with an individual of his sex will face the penalty of death by public stoning" (Rajm). According to the Human Dignity Trust and Amnesty International, the death penalty has not been imposed since 1986. Women face prison between three months to two years imprisonment, and a fine of 5,000 to 60,000 Mauritanian Ouguiya.

Living conditions

The U.S. Department of State's 2011 human rights report found that, "There were no criminal prosecutions during the year. There was no evidence of societal violence, societal discrimination, or systematic government discrimination based on sexual orientation. There were no organizations advocating for sexual orientation or gender-identity rights, but there were no legal impediments to the operation of such groups." The State Department's reports of later years similarly report either no known arrests, or state that authorities did not actively enforce the law.

Summary table

See also

Human rights in Mauritania
Capital punishment for homosexuality

References

Mauritania
Mauritania
LGBT in Mauritania
Human rights in Mauritania
Law of Mauritania